The Nissan Z engine is a series of automobile and light truck four-cylinder engines that was engineered by Nissan Machinery, manufactured by the Nissan Motor Company from 1979 through August 1989. All Z engines had 4 cylinders, a total of 8 valves and a single overhead camshaft (SOHC). Displacements ranged from 1.6 L to 2.4 L.The Z series' engine blocks were nearly identical to those of the earlier L Series with the exception of the Z24. While the Z16 and Z18 engines had a deck height similar to the earlier L13/L14/L16/L18 variants, the Z24 had a taller deck height to accommodate a longer stroke. The most notable difference between the Z-series engine and its predecessor was the introduction of a new crossflow cylinder head which reduced emissions by moving the intake ports to the right side of the engine opposite the exhaust ports. This change allows the exhaust port velocity to more effectively scavenge the cylinder and reduce reversion pulses to enhance induction. This change also limits maximum valve lift/lobe lift profiles rendering the cylinder head and valve train configuration undesirable for high-performance uses. The Z series evolved into the NA and KA engines which, along with the smaller CA series, replaced the Z series .

Z16
The Z16 made its first appearance in 1978 in the Nissan Violet A11. Offered only in selected overseas markets, this version of the engine came with a single downdraft carburetor. Later it was also available on low-end model Datsun Bluebird 910s for the Japanese domestic market and some Nissan commercial vehicles in a single-plug configuration.

Reference specifications (twin plug):
 Displacement : 
 Bore × stroke : 
 Compression ratio  : 8.8:1
 Maximum output (JIS gross) :  at 6,000 rpm
 Maximum torque (gross) :  at 3,600 rpm

Car models:
 1982-1986 Datsun 720 (single plug specification)
 Nissan Navara (D21) (Japan name: Datsun truck / single plug specification)
 1979 Nissan Bluebird 810
 Nissan Bluebird 910
 Nissan Atlas (F22) (single plug specification)
 Nissan Skyline (C210)
 Nissan Violet (A10)

The Z16E is an EFI version of the Z16S, fitted with Nissan's EGI system. Released at the same time as the Z16S, it was used on the Nissan Violet. It has almost the same internal structure as the less powerful Z16S.

Reference specifications:
 Maximum output (JIS gross):  at 6,000 rpm
 Maximum torque (JIS gross):  at 4,000 rpm
 Other numbers are equivalent to Z16S.

Car models:
 Nissan Violet (A11)

Z18
The Z18 debuted in 1977, the first model of the Z-type engine to be released. A 1980 twin-carburetor version produced  at 6,000 rpm (SAE).
Z18 was also available in some of the commercial vehicle engine lineups; those models were of a single plug cylinder head design.

Reference specifications:
 Displacement: 
 Compression ratio: 8.8:1
 Maximum output (gross):  at 6000 rpm
 Maximum torque (gross):  at 3600 rpm
 Above those of the twin plug specification engine

Car models:

 811-Series Nissan Bluebird
 P910 type Nissan Bluebird / Datsun · 180B
 PC231 type Nissan Laurel / Datsun-180L 1978.11-1980.11
 C31 type Nissan Laurel 1980.11-1982.09
 JF30-Series Nissan Leopard 1800
 S110-Series Nissan Silvia / Nissan Gazelle
 PC211 type Nissan Skyline 1800 / Datsun · 180K
 PJR30 type Nissan Skyline 1800
 RA11 type Nissan Violet / Auster / stanza / Datsun · 180J
 D720 type Datsun Truck (1982-1985 single plug specification)
 D21 type Datsun Truck (single plug specification)

Z18E
The Z18E is a  fuel-injected engine produced primarily for the Japanese market.

Applications:
 Nissan Bluebird 910
 Nissan Skyline 1800TI (C210)
 Nissan Skyline 1800TI (R30)

Z18ET
The Z18ET is a  turbocharged and fuel-injected engine first introduced in the 1979 S110 Silvia/Gazelle. It was produced primarily for the Japanese market and produced .

Applications:
  1979-1983 Nissan Silvia S110
 1979-1986 Datsun Bluebird 910 -  at 6000 rpm,  at 3600 rpm

Z20S
The Z20S (S denotes carbureted) is a  engine with a bore and stroke of  that produced from 1979 through 1988. It replaced the L20B while using many of the same bottom-end components.

Applications:
 1979-1981 Datsun 510 ( SAE)
 1981 Datsun 720
 Nissan Cabstar (Europe,  DIN at 5000 rpm)
 1980-1986 Nissan/Datsun Caravan/Urvan/Nissan Homy E23 ( at 5200 rpm, European versions have )
 1986-1997 Nissan Caravan/Urvan/Homy E24
 1985-1988 Nissan Vanette C22 ( at 5200rpm)
 1979.10-1980.11 Nissan Laurel C230
 1980.11-1984.10 Nissan Laurel C31 ( at 5600 rpm)

In the US, the Z20S was only available in the 1980-81 510/A10 and 1984 720 pickup with the MPG option.
 
They were noted for being faster than their competition from Toyota primarily because the Z20S engine produced more power than the engines available in the equivalent Hiace. There was also a dual-fuel version capable of running on LPG, called the Z20D.

Z20E
The Z20E is a fuel-injected version of the Z20S engine produced from 1979 through July 1984. It had longer connecting rods and shorter compression-height pistons than the 1980-81 Z20S. It produces . The Z20E was not available in the 720 pickup, which only used carbureted versions. The Z20 engine was not available at all in US-spec. 720 pickups nor California-spec. D21 pickups.

Applications:
 1979-1981 Datsun 200SX
 1985-1988 Nissan Pickup D21

Z22S
The Z22S (carb only) was  produced from 1980 through early 1983. It produces  SAE as fitted to the US-market Datsun 720.

Applications:
 1981-1982 Datsun 720

Z22E
The Z22E is a fuel-injected version of the Z22 engine produced from 1981 through 1983, mainly for North America. This engine has longer connecting rods and shorter compression-height pistons than the carbureted Z22S engine.

Applications:
 1981-1983 Datsun 200SX ( SAE at 5200 rpm)

Z24
The Z24 was  produced from 1983 through August 1989. A throttle-body fuel injection version (Z24i) was also produced, beginning in April 1985.

Applications:
 1983.5-1986 Nissan/Datsun 720
 1986 Nissan/Datsun 720 (Z24i) (ST models only)
 1986-1989 Nissan Hardbody Truck (Z24i)
 1986-1989 Nissan Pathfinder (E model only)
 1987-1990 Nissan Vanette/Nomad
various Forklift applications Z24 versions in gas and LPG

Note:  All USDM gasoline Z20, Z22 and Z24 engines were known as NAPS-Z (NAPZ or NAPS-Z Nissan Anti-Pollution System), NAPZ motors had dual spark-plugs (two per cylinder) except the pre-82 versions and latest versions of the Z24i as fitted to the Pathfinder. All NAPZ engines sold in California reportedly had dual plug heads regardless of the year.

The fuel-injected version referenced above was denoted as the Z24i (Throttle Body Fuel Injection) and was first available in the Nissan Model 720 ST pickup during the 1985 model year and was replaced in 1990 by the KA24E engine and they share the same bellhousing pattern. Beside the fuel-injection, a significant change for the Z24i was the addition of an optical crank angle sensor in the distributor rather than a vacuum advance and ignition module. This allowed the JECS throttle-body injection system to identify the top dead center (TDC) of cylinder number one.

Engine Displacement: 
Bore x Stroke: 
Compression Ratio: 8.3:1
     
Power Ratings:

Z24
      
Years - 1984-1986
Power   -  at 4800 rpm 
Torque -  at 2800 rpm

Z24i
      
Years - 1986-1989
Power   -  at 4800 rpm
Torque -  at 2400 rpm

See also
 List of Nissan engines

References

External links
 New Zealand Datsun Club

Z
Gasoline engines by model
Straight-four engines